Mahbub Ali Khan (3 November 1934 – 6 August 1984) was a Bangladesh Navy rear admiral and the Chief of Naval Staff from 1979 till his death in 1984. He is known for his heroic actions done for his country. Under him the South Talpatti sandbar and other emerging islands in the Bay of Bengal, over which both India and Bangladesh claimed sovereignty, remained under the authority of Bangladesh. He is also known for bringing down the pirates in the Bay of Bengal and was responsible for maintaining the security of the Bay and the Sundarbans.

Early life and family
Khan was born into a wealthy Bengali Muslim zamindar family on 3 November 1934 in Jalalpur, Sylhet District (present-day Bangladesh) located in the British Raj's Assam Province. He was the youngest child among the three children of Ahmed Ali Khan and Jubaida Khatun. Khatun was the daughter of Khan Bahadur Wasiuddin Ahmad. In 1901, Ahmad Ali Khan became the first Muslim barrister in Sylhet. Ahmad Ali Khan was also the President of the Assam Congress and represented the All-India Muslim League party as a member of the Legislative Assembly.

Mahbub Ali Khan's grandfather, Khan Bahadur Dr. Asaddar Ali Khan (1850-1937), Sylhet's first Muslim civil surgeon and the son-in-law of Syed Ameer Ali. A graduate of the Aliah University, Asaddar Ali Khan was also the personal physician to the Bihari Shia lawyer-politician Syed Hasan Imam, the top barrister of Calcutta High Court and leader of the Indian National Congress. M.A. Khan's grand-uncle Ghazanfar Ali Khan OBE ICS was the first Muslim Cambridge graduate from Assam and Bengal. Mahbub was also the cousin of General M. A. G. Osmani, the Supreme Commander of Bangladesh Forces during the Bangladesh Liberation War, and Ajmal Ali Choudhury, a Member of the National Assembly of Pakistan.

Khan spent his childhood in the Sylhet District and Kolkata. After the independence of Pakistan, his family moved to Dhaka in East Pakistan. He received his primary education in Kolkata and Dhaka and has spent his college time in Dhaka College. Later he took a law degree. Khan's niece is the Harvard-educated Irene Khan, former head of Amnesty International.

Career

In 1952 Khan joined the executive branch of the Pakistan Navy as a cadet. Khan received his training as a cadet in a military school in Quetta of West Pakistan. For higher training he went to finish his graduation at Britannia Royal Naval College in Dartmouth, England. After his graduation he married Sayeeda Iqbal Manda Banu in 1955. They had two daughters – Shahina Khan and Zubaida Khan. On 1 May 1956, Khan received his standing commission. In 1960 he became the Gunnery officer of P.N.S (Pakistani Naval Ship) Tughril. In 1963, Queen Elizabeth II awarded him for being a disciplined officer. In 1964 he became the torpedo and anti-submarine officer of P.N.S Tippu Sultan. From 1967 to 1968 he served the Pakistan Navy as the Joint Chiefs’ Secretariat Staff officer in the Defence Ministry in Rawalpindi of West Pakistan. In 1970 he became the officer in charge of the torpedo and anti-submarine school in the P.N.S Himalaya and in the West Pakistani city of Karachi he served as the Seaward defence officer.

During the Bangladesh Liberation War in 1971, when East Pakistan became Bangladesh and then went to war with West Pakistan for independence, Khan, at that time, was still staying in West Pakistan. Because of his patriotism towards Bangladesh, Khan and his family was placed under house arrest by the Pakistan government. Even after the war was over, Khan was still placed under house arrest for two more years till 1973, when he was able to escape from West Pakistan to Afghanistan. From Afghanistan he went to India and then finally to his motherland, Bangladesh.

In October 1973, in Bangladesh Khan became the first Bengali to be appointed as the commandant of the Mercantile Academy of Chittagong. In February 1976 he became the Assistant Chief of Naval Staff (Operations and Personnel) of the Bangladesh Navy. In December 1976 the Royal Navy of the United Kingdom sold a Salisbury class frigate to Bangladesh which came to be known as BNS (Bangladeshi Naval Ship) Umar Farooq. The ship arrived in Bangladesh on 27 March 1977. Khan became the captain of the BNS Umar Farooq and with this ship he travelled to the ports of Algeria, Yugoslavia, Egypt, Saudi Arabia and Sri Lanka.  On 4 November 1979, Khan became the Chief of Naval Staff of the Bangladesh Navy and on 1 January 1980 he grew to the rank of rear admiral.

Khan worked hard to modernise the Bangladesh Navy. In the aftermath of the Bhola cyclone in 1970, a small uninhabited offshore sandbar landform called the South Talpatti sandbar emerged in the Bay of Bengal. Although South Talpatti was uninhabited and there were no permanent settlements or stations located on it, both India and Bangladesh claimed sovereignty over it because of speculation over the existence of oil and natural gas in the region. Under Khan, the sandbar remained under Bangladeshi authority. During his time the Bangladesh Navy was also able to bring down the pirates in the Bay of Bengal. Khan also took possible measures to maintain the security of the Sundarbans.

During the time of Ziaur Rahman's rule, besides being the head of the navy, Khan also served as the minister of telecommunications. Khan was also a member of President Zia's temporarily formed party called JAGODAL. On 24 March 1982, when martial law was imposed in Bangladesh and general Hussain Mohammad Ershad took over the government, Khan was appointed as the deputy chief martial law administrator. At that time he also became an adviser of the Ministry of Communications. From 10 July 1982 to 1 June 1984, he served as a minister of the Ministry of Communications. Till his death, he served as the Minister of Agriculture in the country.

Personal life
Khan is married to Syeda Iqbal Mand Banu. Their youngest daughter, Zubaida Rahman, married Tarique Rahman, the elder son of President Ziaur Rahman and Prime Minister Khaleda Zia, in 1993.

Death

On 6 August 1984, Khan went to the then Dhaka International Airport in Dhaka to investigate an air crash in that area. There, while investigating the air crash, Khan had a heart attack and he was taken to the Combined Military Hospital (CMH), where he died at the age of 49. His burial place is at the Banani defence graveyard in Dhaka.

References

|-

Bangladeshi Navy admirals
1934 births
1984 deaths
Burials at Banani Graveyard
Chiefs of Naval Staff (Bangladesh)
Pakistan Navy officers
People from Dakshin Surma Upazila
Road Transport and Bridges ministers of Bangladesh
Bangladeshi people of Afghan descent